Thermostilla is a thermophilic genus of bacteria from the family of Planctomycetaceae with one known species (Thermostilla marina). Thermostilla marina has been isolated from a hydrothermal vent from a Vulcano Island in Italy.

References

Bacteria genera
Monotypic bacteria genera
Planctomycetota